BOX Options Exchange, LLC (BOX) is an automated exchange operated by the TMX Group and owned by TMX and a consortium of broker-dealers. As an equity options market, it provides electronic order matching services to stockbrokers and traders.

Overview 
BOX Holdings Group LLC is the parent holding company of the BOX Options Market LLC (BOX Options), and BOX Digital Markets LLC. BOX Options was established in 2002 and launched trading in February 2004 as an alternative to the then-existing market models. BOX Options currently operates both electronic and open outcry venues for the trading of equity options. 

BOX Digital was founded in 2018 and is engaged in creating and developing markets for trading digital assets in a regulated environment. BOX Exchange LLC is a national securities exchange registered with the SEC under Section 6 of the Securities Exchange Act of 1934.
BOX Options is an equity options market that is jointly owned by the TMX Group and a group of broker/dealers. BOX was established in 2002 and launched trading in February 2004 as an alternative to the then-existing market models.

Services 
The exchange offers options derivatives on approximately 1,500 different securities. It generates fully tradeable orders and provides multiple competing market makers. BOX also provides SOLA, a trading platform which matches or improves option prices and responds to orders in less than 20 milliseconds.

PIP Algorithm 
BOX offers price improvement to traders through its patent-pending Price Improvement Period automated trading mechanism. PIP allows clients with broker guarantees on the first penny of price improvement a small period to improve upon available prices. In June 2007, BOX was named U.S. options exchange of the year by Futures and Options World Magazine. CEO R. Scott Morris attributed BOX's success to the PIP algorithm, noting the "$110 million in savings to investors because of our price improvement model.”

See also
 List of stock exchanges
 List of stock exchanges in the Americas
 List of stock exchange mergers in the Americas

References

External links 

 

Financial services companies established in 2002
Companies based in Boston
Stock exchanges in the United States
2002 establishments in Massachusetts
Options exchanges in the United States